Frederick Hunt may refer to:

 Frederick Hunt (cricketer) (1875–1967), English cricketer
 Jack Hunt (RAF officer) (Frederick John Hunt, 1899–1954), English World War I flying ace
 Frederick Vinton Hunt (1905–1972), inventor, scientist and acoustic engineering professor at Harvard University
 Frederick Seager Hunt (1837–1904), British Conservative Party politician and distiller
 Frederick Knight Hunt (1814–1854), English journalist and author